Jim Scheer (born September 19, 1953) is an American politician who served as a Nebraska state senator in the unicameral Nebraska Legislature representing District 19; the legislature itself is non-partisan.

Education
Scheer earned his BS in business administration from University of Nebraska–Lincoln.

Elections
In 2012, incumbent Mike Flood was termed out. Scheer placed first in the May primary election, with 4,497 votes. He won the November general election, receiving 10,441 votes to William Goodpasture's 3,014.

References

External links
 Official page at the Nebraska Legislature
 
 Biography at Ballotpedia
 Financial information (state office) at the National Institute for Money in State Politics

1953 births
21st-century American politicians
Living people
Mayors of places in Nebraska
Republican Party Nebraska state senators
People from Norfolk, Nebraska
Speakers of the Nebraska Legislature
University of Nebraska–Lincoln alumni